Arion is a physically based, unbiased render engine developed by RandomControl.

Versions
Arion standalone is a general purpose rendering tool with a visual UI. There are also versions that integrate into 3ds Max and Rhinoceros.

See also
 POV-Ray - A historical raytracer.
 Indigo Renderer - A commercial unbiased renderer.
 Octane Render - A commercial unbiased GPU-accelerated renderer.
 Sunflow - An open source unbiased renderer.
 YafaRay - An open source raytrace renderer.

References

External links
 

Rendering systems